The Rig is a British supernatural thriller television series created by David Macpherson for Amazon Prime Video. The series is directed by John Strickland, and is the first Amazon Original to be filmed entirely in Scotland. The series was released on 6 January 2023 and consists of six episodes. In February 2023, the series was renewed for a second season.

Premise 
A Scottish oil rig in the North Sea is enveloped in an unnatural fog that cuts them off from outside communications.  Spores found in the fog cause infected crew members to experience behavioural changes.  After examining the spores, a scientist onboard the oil rig suspects that an ancient parasite has been unleashed from the ocean floor.

Cast and characters 
 Emily Hampshire as Rose Mason: The oil company representative and scientist, and a fresh face on-board the rig.
 Iain Glen as Magnus MacMillan: The leader of the crew and the offshore installation manager of the rig.
 Martin Compston as Fulmer Hamilton
 Mark Bonnar as Alwyn Evans
 Rochenda Sandall as Cat Braithwaite
 Owen Teale as Lars Hutton
 Richard Pepple as Grant Dunlin
 Calvin Demba as Baz Roberts
 Emun Elliott as Leck Longman
 Abraham Popoola as Easter Ayodeji
 Stuart McQuarrie as Colin Murchison
 Molly Vevers as Heather Shaw
 Dougie Rankin as William Johnson
 Nikhil Parmar as Harish
 Mark Addy as David Coake

Episodes

Production

Development 
David Macpherson first came up with the idea for the series in 2018, based in part on the stories his father told him about working in the oil and gas industry. He sent a one-page pitch to producer Derek Wax, and began writing it in December 2018. In November 2020, it was announced that Amazon had greenlit The Rig. The series is written and created by David Macpherson, and directed and executive produced by John Strickland. Derek Wax also executive produces, while Suzanne Reid produces. Wax's company Wild Mercury Productions produces the series. On 22 February 2023, Amazon renewed the series for a second season.

Writing 
Work started on the series' scripts in December 2018. Meg Salter and Matthew Jacobs Morgan serve as writers.

Casting 

In mid-March 2021, Emily Hampshire, Martin Compston, and Mark Bonnar were cast in key roles. The next day, Iain Glen, Rochenda Sandall, Owen Teale, Richard Pepple, Calvin Demba, Emun Elliott, Abraham Popoola, Stuart McQuarrie, and Molly Vevers were cast. Kelly Valentine-Hendry serves as the casting director for the series.

Filming 
Filming started on 29 March 2021, at an oil rig in Scotland, and at FirstStage Studios in Edinburgh. The series is the first Amazon Original to be filmed entirely in Scotland. Filming wrapped in August 2021. The first three episodes were directed by John Strickland, and the final three were directed by Alex Holmes.

Reception
The review aggregator website Rotten Tomatoes reports a 63% approval rating and an average rating of 6.2/10 based on 16 critic reviews. The website's critics consensus reads, "The Rig may not plumb its full potential thanks to too many crude clichés, but this supernatural eco-thriller has enough ambience and appealing performances to make for a solid binge." Metacritic, which uses a weighted average, assigned a score of 69 out of 100 based on 7 critics, indicating "generally favorable reviews".

Release 
The official trailer was released on 29 November 2022. The pilot episode premiered at Everyman cinema in Leith, Scotland, on 6 December 2022. The six-episode series was released on 6 January 2023.

References

External links 
 
 

2020s British drama television series
2020s supernatural television series
2023 British television series debuts
Amazon Prime Video original programming
British supernatural television shows
British thriller television series
English-language television shows
Psychological thriller television series
Television shows filmed in Scotland
Television series by Banijay
Television series by Amazon Studios
Works about petroleum